The Duke Blue Devils men's lacrosse team represents Duke University in National Collegiate Athletic Association (NCAA) Division I men's lacrosse. Duke currently competes as a member of the Atlantic Coast Conference (ACC) and plays its home games at Koskinen Stadium in Durham, North Carolina. The principal rivalry of Duke is their all-sports nemesis North Carolina.

History
The first lacrosse game played by Duke took place on April 9, 1938, when the Blue Devils traveled to meet their nearby rivals, North Carolina, which itself had just formed a team the year prior. Duke won that contest, 2–1. The first home game occurred a week later when they hosted Syracuse, who beat the Blue Devils, 17–5. Duke finished the season with a 2–5 record, with their second win also over North Carolina, this time in Durham. The following season, the Blue Devils compiled a 7–1 mark and secured the Dixie Lacrosse League championship.

Ray Brown became Duke's first lacrosse All-American in 1940 and was honored as such again the following year. In 1946, Duke opened the season with an upset over national power Maryland in College Park, 12–4. Despite finishing the season with a 2–3 record, the Blue Devils were awarded the Southern Lacrosse Association championship.

The 1951 team is often regarded as one of Duke's most successful pre-NCAA teams. The Blue Devils routed conference opponent Washington & Lee, 26–8. They also scored victories against powerhouses, beating Navy, 17–6, and Johns Hopkins, 9–7. The lone loss was by a one-goal margin and came against Virginia. Duke finished the season with a 6–1 record.

The newly formed Atlantic Coast Conference (ACC) sanctioned lacrosse in 1954, and Duke captured the league's first title after posting a 7–1–1 season. Starting the following year however, the Blue Devils entered a twelve-year slump where they compiled a combined 17–67 record with no winning seasons. In 1967, Roy Skinner and Bruce Corrie took over as co-head coaches and immediately reversed the team's fortunes, posting a 7–4 record that season and finishing second in the ACC. In 1971, Corrie became the sole coach after Skinner retired.

Mike Pressler was hired as head coach in 1991, and the following season Duke made its first NCAA tournament appearance. In 1994, the Blue Devils posted their first tournament win, which was also their first victory against Maryland in Durham since 1954. They were then edged, 12–11, in the quarterfinals by Syracuse. The next year, Duke won its first ACC tournament, and in the process became the first number-four seed to do so. Two years later, they advanced to the Final Four. Duke won consecutive ACC tournaments in 2001 and 2002, and advanced to the 2005 NCAA final before losing to Johns Hopkins, 9–8. The 2006 season was cut short when several Duke players were falsely accused of rape. As a result of the incident, Duke forced Pressler to resign as head coach, and the NCAA granted the players an extra season of eligibility.

John Danowski replaced Pressler, and in his first season in 2007, he led the Blue Devils to the ACC championship and a return to the NCAA title game. Duke again lost to Johns Hopkins by one goal, 12–11. In 2010, Duke returned to the final, where it defeated Notre Dame, 6–5 in overtime, to capture its first NCAA championship.

In the 2013 season, Duke defeated Syracuse 16–10 to win their second NCAA lacrosse championship.

In the 2014 season, Duke defeated Notre Dame 11–9 to win their third NCAA lacrosse championship.

Season results
The following is a list of Duke's results by season as an NCAA Division I program:

{| class="wikitable"

|- align="center"

†Remainder of 2006 season cancelled due to the Duke lacrosse case

††NCAA canceled 2020 collegiate activities due to the COVID-19 virus.

Alumni in the Premier Lacrosse League (11)

See also
 Duke lacrosse case
 Duke–North Carolina lacrosse rivalry

References

External links
 

NCAA Division I men's lacrosse teams
 
1938 establishments in North Carolina
Lacrosse clubs established in 1938